Hombres, the plural of Hombre and sometimes used informally in English, may refer to:

Film and television
 Hombres, a Norwegian-Swedish drama series
 Hombres de barro, a 1988 Argentine film
 Hombres de honor, a 2005 Argentine telenovela
 Hombres de esta tierra, a 1922 Chilean silent film
 Men of the Sea (1938 Mexican film), originally known as Hombres de Mar

Music
 The Hombres, a 1960s American garage rock band
 "Hombres" (song), a song recorded by Spanish singer Eva Santamaría
 "Hombres al Borde de un Ataque de Celos", a dance song written by J.R. Florez
 Hombres Con Pañales (K-Narias), an album by K-Narias
 Hombres G, a Spanish pop rock band
 Hombres G (album), their debut album

Other uses
 Hombres (slamball team) (formerly the Diablos), the Slamball team
 Hombres y Héroes, a series of Mexican comics
 Los Hombres del Camuflaje, a Mexican sibling professional wrestling tag team
 Men of Maize, originally known as Hombres de Maíz, a 1949 novel by Miguel Ángel Asturias

See also
 Hombre (disambiguation), the singular of Hombres
 Ombre, a seventeenth-century trick-taking card game
 Ombré, the gradual blending of one color hue to another